Epipogium roseum, commonly known as the ghost orchid, leafless nodding orchid or 虎舌兰 (hu she lan), is a leafless terrestrial mycotrophic orchid in the family Orchidaceae. It has up to sixteen cream-coloured, yellowish or pinkish flowers with an enlarged ovary on a fleshy hollow flowering stem. This ghost orchid is widely distributed in tropical Africa, Asia, Southeast Asia, New Guinea, Australia and some Pacific Islands.

Description 
The dorsal sepal and petals are joined at the base and spread weakly. Flowering occurs from December to March in Australia and from April to September in China. The plants appear a few days after the first heavy rains of the wet season and set seed within a few days.

Taxonomy and naming
This ghost orchid was first described in 1857 by David Don who gave it the name Limodorum roseum and published the description in Prodromus florae Nepalensis. In 1857, John Lindley changed the name to Epipogium roseum. The specific epithet (roseum) is a Latin word meaning "rose-coloured".

Distribution and habitat
Epipogium roseum grows in high rainfall habitats, especially rainforest, on decaying wood. It is found in many countries including China, India, Indonesia, Japan, Kashmir, Laos, Malaysia, Nepal, the Philippines, Sri Lanka, Thailand, Vietnam, tropical Africa, New Guinea, Australia and some Pacific islands including the Solomon Islands. In Australia it occurs from the Windsor Tableland in Queensland to the Macleay River in New South Wales.

References 

Epipogiinae
Orchids of Queensland
Terrestrial orchids
Plants described in 1857